Frances Lorraine Maria O'Grady, Baroness O'Grady of Upper Holloway (born 9 November 1959) became the General Secretary of the British Trades Union Congress (TUC) in 2013, the first woman to hold the position. After O'Grady presented her resignation in 2022, Paul Nowak was selected to succeed her; he took up the post on 29 December 2022. O'Grady sits as a life peer in the House of Lords.

Early life and family
O'Grady was born in Oxford, one of five siblings in a family of Irish descent, and was brought up in the Roman Catholic faith. Her father was a shop steward at the Leyland car plant in Cowley. She was educated at Milham Ford School, a grammar school which became comprehensive during her time there. At Manchester University, she earned a BA Hons in politics and modern history. She received a Diploma in Industrial Relations and Trade Union Studies at Middlesex Polytechnic.

She has two adult children, whom she raised as a working single parent, and currently lives in London.

Career
O'Grady worked for the Transport and General Workers' Union, where she opposed the abolition of the Agricultural Wages Board, and campaigned for a minimum wage. She became TUC Campaigns Secretary in 1994 and founded the TUC Organising Academy in 1997, a scheme aimed at supporting a younger and more representative group of workers to become labour movement organisers.

She became head of the TUC's organisation department in 1999, and was then elected as Deputy General Secretary in 2003.

She led on the establishment of the union learning organisation unionlearn, which came into being in 2006. Unionlearn works with employers, unions and government to help around 220,000 workers per year to improve basic skills and access lifelong learning.

She became TUC General Secretary in January 2013, succeeding Brendan Barber.

In 2013, in line with the TUC, she was among those who gave their support to the People's Assembly in a letter published by The Guardian newspaper.<ref>People's Assembly opening letter, The Guardian', 5 February 2013.</ref>
'
She has been a member of the Resolution Foundation's Commission on Living Standards, as well as serving on the TUC's Commission on Vulnerable Employment, the Low Pay Commission and the High Pay Commission.  She has campaigned prominently during the referendum on EU membership, as the TUC registered for the remain side, particularly citing concerns around the impact on workers' rights and jobs in export led industries.

O'Grady has led a protest outside Bestway, Britain's largest family owned business. In February 2013 she was, as a result of her efforts, assessed as the 11th most powerful woman in Britain by Woman's Hour on BBC Radio 4.

She was appointed as a Non-Executive Director of Bank of England in June 2019.  In April 2022, O'Grady announced that she will leave her post as TUC's general secretary at the end of the year and will be replaced by Paul Nowak in January 2023.

It was announced on 14 October 2022, that as part of the 2022 Special Honours, O'Grady would receive a life peerage, sitting for the Labour Party. On 9 December 2022, she was created Baroness O'Grady of Upper Holloway, of Wood Farm in the City of Oxford''.

References

External links

 
 Official TUC page on Frances O'Grady

|-

1959 births
Alumni of the University of Manchester
Alumni of Middlesex University
English people of Irish descent
General Secretaries of the Trades Union Congress
British trade union leaders
Living people
People from Oxford
Labour Party (UK) life peers
Life peers created by Charles III
Life peeresses created by Charles III
21st-century British politicians
21st-century British women politicians